The Proceedings of the Institution of Mechanical Engineers, Part H: Journal of Engineering in Medicine is a monthly peer-reviewed medical journal that covers the field of biomedical engineering. It was established in 1971 as Engineering in Medicine, obtaining its current title in 1989. The journal is published by SAGE Publications on behalf of the Institution of Mechanical Engineers.

Abstracting and indexing 
The Journal of Engineering in Medicine is abstracted and indexed in Scopus and the Science Citation Index. According to the Journal Citation Reports, its 2021 impact factor is 1.617.

References

External links 
 

Biomedical engineering
Engineering journals
English-language journals
Institution of Mechanical Engineers academic journals
Monthly journals
Publications established in 1971
SAGE Publishing academic journals